The Military Committee of the European Union (EUMC) is the body of the European Union's (EU) Common Security and Defence Policy that is composed of member states' Chiefs of Defence (CHOD). These national CHODs are regularly represented in the EUMC in Brussels by their permanent Military Representatives (MilRep), who often are two- or three-star flag officers.

The EUMC is under the under authority of the EU's High Representative (HR) and the Political and Security Committee (PSC).

History
The EUMC was formally established in December 2000 by the European Council of Nice, and is one of several defence and security-related bodies established as a result of the Helsinki Headline Goal, which was decided in December 1999.

Function
The EUMC gives military advice to the EU's High Representative (HR) and Political and Security Committee (PSC). The EUMC also oversees the European Union Military Staff (EUMS).

Role in command and control of missions

Chairman

The EUMC is chaired by a General Officer, Admiral, or Air Officer of four-star level (i.e. NATO OF-9 equivalent) who is selected by the Chiefs of Defence and appointed by the Council of the European Union. For a term of three years the chairman is the spokesperson for the EUMC, he participates in PSC meetings as appropriate, he is the military adviser to the High Representative of the Union for Foreign Affairs and Security Policy (HR) who heads the EEAS European External Action Service, he represents the primary point of contact with the Operation Commanders of the EU's military operations and he attends Council meetings with defence and security implications.

See also

Common Security and Defence Policy
European External Action Service
Military of the European Union
Political and Security Committee 
European Union Military Staff

A similar committee also exists within the North Atlantic Treaty Organisation (NATO), and those countries which are members of both EU and NATO have in most cases chosen to use the same MilRep in both organisations.

References

External links

 CSDP structure, instruments, and agencies, EEAS website
 Mai'a K. Davis Cross: "The Military Dimension of European Security: An Epistemic Community Approach." (2013) Millennium Journal of International Studies, 42(1): 45–64.

 
2000 in the European Union